Anions that interact weakly with cations are termed non-coordinating anions, although a more accurate term is weakly coordinating anion. Non-coordinating anions are useful in studying the reactivity of electrophilic cations. They are commonly found  as counterions for cationic metal complexes with an unsaturated coordination sphere. These special anions are essential components of homogeneous alkene polymerisation catalysts, where the active catalyst is a coordinatively unsaturated, cationic transition metal complex. For example, they are employed as counterions for the 14 valence electron cations [(C5H5)2ZrR]+ (R = methyl or a growing polyethylene chain). Complexes derived from non-coordinating anions have been used to catalyze hydrogenation, hydrosilylation, oligomerization, and the living polymerization of alkenes. The popularization of non-coordinating anions has contributed to increased understanding of agostic complexes wherein hydrocarbons and hydrogen serve as ligands. Non-coordinating anions are important components of many superacids, which result from the combination of Brønsted acids and Lewis acids.

Pre-"BARF" era
Before the 1990s, tetrafluoroborate, hexafluorophosphate, and  perchlorate were considered weakly coordinating anions.  These species are now known to bind to strongly electrophilic metal centers. Tetrafluoroborate and hexafluorophosphate anions are coordinating toward highly electrophilic metal ions, such as cations containing Zr(IV) centers, which can abstract fluoride from these anions. Other anions, such as triflates are considered to be low-coordinating with some cations.

Era of BARF

This anion is far less coordinating than tetrafluoroborate, hexafluorophosphate, and perchlorate, and consequently has enabled the study of still more electrophilic cations.

In the bulky borates and aluminates, the negative charge is symmetrically distributed over many electronegative atoms. Related anions are derived from tris(pentafluorophenyl)boron B(C6F5)3.  Another advantage of these anions is that their salts are more soluble in non-polar organic solvents such as dichloromethane, toluene, and, in some cases, even alkanes.  Polar solvents, such as acetonitrile, THF, and water, tend to bind to electrophilic centers, in which cases, the use of a non-coordinating anion is pointless.

Salts of the anion  were first reported by Kobayashi and co-workers.  For that reason, it is sometimes referred to as Kobayashi's anion. Kobayashi's method of preparation has been superseded by a safer route.

The neutral molecules that represent the parents to the non-coordinating anions are strong Lewis acids, e.g. boron trifluoride, BF3 and phosphorus pentafluoride, PF5.  A notable Lewis acid of this genre is tris(pentafluorophenyl)borane, B(C6F5)3, which abstracts alkyl ligands:
(C5H5)2Zr(CH3)2 + B(C6F5)3 → [(C5H5)2Zr(CH3)]+[(CH3)B(C6F5)3]−

Other types of non-coordinating anions
Another large class of non-coordinating anions are derived from carborane anion . Using this anion, the first example of a three-coordinate silicon compound, the salt  [(mesityl)3Si][HCB11Me5Br6] contains a non-coordinating anion derived from a carborane.

References

Coordination chemistry